Caulkins is a surname. Notable people with the surname include:
F.W. Caulkins (1855–1940), American architect
Frances Manwaring Caulkins (1795–1869), American historian, genealogist, author
Horace Caulkins (1850–1932), American ceramic artist
Jonathan Caulkins (born 1965), American drug policy researcher
Tracy Caulkins (born 1963), American swimmer

See also
Ellie Caulkins Opera House, Denver, Colorado, U.S.A